Hansi Wendler (1912–2010) was a German film actress.

Selected filmography
 Men Are That Way (1939)
 Two in a Big City (1942)
 I'll Carry You in My Arms (1943)
 Why Are You Lying, Elisabeth? (1944)
 The Lost One (1951)

References

Bibliography 
 Goble, Alan. The Complete Index to Literary Sources in Film. Walter de Gruyter, 1999.

External links 
 

1912 births
2010 deaths
German film actresses